Kargaran Stadium is a sporting stadium (mainly used for football/soccer) in Tehran. The teams houses Parseh Tehran F.C. It has capacity of 5,000.

Sports venues in Tehran
Football venues in Iran